The group stage of the 1999 CAF Champions League was played from 21 August to 7 November 1999. A total of eight teams competed in the group stage.

Format
In the group stage, each group was played on a home-and-away round-robin basis. The winners of each group advanced directly to the final.

Groups
The matchdays were 21–22 August, 3–5 September, 18–19 September, 9–10 October, 21–24 October, and 6–7 November 1999.

Group A

Group B

References

External links
1999 CAF Champions League - todor66.com

Group stage